Ander Okamika Bengoetxea (born 2 April 1993) is a Spanish road cyclist and former triathlete, who currently rides for UCI ProTeam .

Major results
2020
 National Amateur Road Championships
1st  Time trial
2nd Road race
 1st Stage 1 Vuelta a Alicante
2021
 9th Coppa Sabatini
 10th Classic Loire Atlantique
2022
  Combativity award Stage 19 Vuelta a España

Grand Tour general classification results timeline

References

External links

1993 births
Living people
Spanish male cyclists
Cyclists from the Basque Country (autonomous community)
People from Lea-Artibai
Sportspeople from Biscay
Spanish male triathletes